Svetlana Vinogradova (born 21 August 1987) is a Russian snowboarder. She competed in the women's halfpipe event at the 2006 Winter Olympics.

References

1987 births
Living people
Russian female snowboarders
Olympic snowboarders of Russia
Snowboarders at the 2006 Winter Olympics
Sportspeople from Novosibirsk